Tokai Communications Corporation Inc (known as Vic Tokai Corporation until 2011)  is a telecommunications company in Japan providing DSL services and network solutions. In North America, it is best known for its video games during the late 1980s and throughout the 1990s. In the US, they published games for the Nintendo Entertainment System, the Game Boy, the Super Nintendo Entertainment System, the Nintendo 64, the Sega Genesis, the Sega CD, the Sega Saturn, and the PlayStation.

History
The following year, in 1978, it adopted the name of Vic Tokai. The "Vic" in Vic Tokai's name stood for Valuable Information & Communication. The "Tokai" part is the name of its then parent company, Tokai Corporation, a Japanese natural gas utility founded in 1950.

Vic Tokai began selling data processing services and computer hardware in April 1982, a sector that until then was handled by parent Tokai Corporation. In 1983, it began developing online and graphics applications for office computers.

In April 1987, parent company Tokai corporation handed its remaining computer-related branches, such as electronic calculation and operational sections, to Vic Tokai, thus making the latter company able to handle data processing operations independently. Vic Tokai expanded in 1988 when it acquired another telecommunication company. The company also launched its first system consulting software the same year.

The 1990s saw a number of new products by Vic Tokai available to the Japanese market. In 1993, Vic Tokai introduced the first version of its long running (and still existing) lineup of network solution products called "TOP-VENUS". Later, Vic Tokai released its own Electronic Data Interchange package known as JFT (Java File Transfer) in 1996. Then in 1998 Vic Tokai developed its "Knowledge Stage" lineup, which is dedicated to helping companies develop their Intranet.

In April 2000, Vic Tokai merged with another CATV company that provides Internet connection services. As a result, Vic Tokai itself immediately became an Internet service provider, and a year later, in April 2001, it entered the ADSL market. Vic Tokai would soon establish a partnership with Japanese peer-to-peer Internet exchange company JPIX.

As the company continued to grow, Vic Tokai earned its place in the market listing of the JASDAQ as of June 2002.

By March 2005, Vic Tokai had completed the build-out of its own high-capacity optical fiber network infrastructure between Tokyo and Nagoya to improve network support for its Internet service customers and enterprises. Vic Tokai continued its expansion in October 2005 when it merged again, this time with Tokai Broadband Communications, enabling Vic Tokai to enter the mobile broadband industry.

On April 1, 2011, Vic Tokai and (then) parent company Tokai Corporation jointly created Tokai Holdings Corporation, a new shell entity to oversee the operation of both companies (as well as other subsidiaries). In October of that year, Vic Tokai was renamed Tokai Communications following its absorption of Tokai Corporation's information and telecommunications business.

In April 2012, the CATV operations of Tokai Communications were spun off into a new company called Tokai Cable Network.

Video games

Vic Tokai was, from 1984 to 1998, a video game developer that manufactured arcade, console and PC games, as well as published games from developers like Kronos Digital Entertainment. The now defunct Vic Tokai Inc division in Torrance, California was tasked with localizing games in North America.

All of Vic Tokai's internally developed video games were created with Sunseibu Entertainment, a sister company from the Tokai Group. Sunseibu also had some involvement with the Aicom-developed Vic tokai game The Mafat Conspiracy.

The Vic Tokai/Sunseibu duo started in 1984 by developing arcade games for Sega. Vic Tokai/Sunseibu expanded in the home market by developing video games for Nintendo consoles (published by Vic Tokai) and for Sega consoles (published by Sega themselves). In the early 1990s, Vic Tokai, which by then had always self-published video games only for Nintendo consoles, became a Sega licensee for the first time.

References

External links
 (current) 
Official website (former) 

Companies based in Shizuoka Prefecture
Telecommunications companies established in 1977
Telecommunications companies of Japan
Video game companies of Japan
Video game publishers
Shizuoka (city)